The Photos were an English new wave band fronted by Wendy Wu, who had a top 5 album in the UK Albums Chart in 1980.

History
The Photos were originally a punk band named Satan's Rats that formed in Evesham, Worcestershire in 1977, with the first stable line-up of Paul Rencher (vocals), Steve Eagles (guitar/vocals), Roy Wilkes (bass guitar), and Olly Harrison (drums). They released three singles as Satans Rats before Wilkes left, to be replaced by Dave Sparrow; and then Rencher left, after which the others deciding to expand the group with the addition of a female singer. They unsuccessfully tried to get Big in Japan's Jayne Casey to join, but convinced Wendy Wu (born Wendy Cruise, 29 November 1959), the former manager of pub rock band City Youth to join in 1979. The Photos signed to CBS Records but moved on to Epic Records after one single. They released a self-titled album (Epic, 1980) and number of singles. These included "I'm So Attractive" and "Barbarellas" (concerning the closure of a Birmingham nightclub).

The album was successful, reaching number 4 in the UK Albums Chart, and Wu's picture was briefly a regular item in the music press. Initial copies of the vinyl release of the album came with a bonus album, The Blackmail Tapes, the additional tracks also included on the cassette release, and the album was supported by the group performing numerous concerts around the UK.

The album was later re-released in CD format, although only a limited number of copies were pressed. The CD was re-released in October 2007 by Cherry Red Records, the label originally due to have signed the band before they were contracted to CBS. The re-release includes some additional tracks including "I'm So Attractive".

They released several singles in the UK including "I'm So Attractive". which was added to the US album release. "I'm So Attractive" was not included on the CD that was released in 1999, along with eight additional tracks from The Blackmail Tapes.

Their scheduled appearance on BBC Television's Top of the Pops was cancelled due to industrial action. A second album, Crystal Tips and Mighty Mice, was released in promotional form in 1981, but withdrawn before it reached the shops, and reissued by Cherry Red Records in 2008. Wu left the band in 1981, to be replaced by Che, and The Photos split up later that year.

Wu went on to release some generally poorly received solo singles during 1982 and 1983, and then joined Steve Strange to form the duo Strange Cruise in 1986.

The Photos reformed without Wu, although this line-up only released one single, "There's Always Work", in 1983. Later, when Harrison had left the band, they reformed briefly with Angus Hines playing drums. They were joined by Wu for a one-off gig at London's Marquee Club, before finally disbanding. Steve Eagles became guitarist in Ted Milton's Blurt, and later formed Bang Bang Machine. Oliver Harrison went on to become a filmmaker.

In 2022, members of the original Satan's Rats collaborated with Pussycat and the Dirty Johnsons frontwoman Puss Johnson as "Satan's Cats".

Discography

Satan's Rats

Albums
What a Bunch of Rodents (2005), Overground – compilation of tracks from the singles plus 13 previously-unreleased tracks

Singles
"In My Love for You" / "Facade" 7" (October 1977), DJM
"Year of the Rats" / "Louise" 7" (December 1977), DJM
"You Make Me Sick" / "Louise" 7" (March 1978), DJM

The Photos

Albums
The Photos (June 1980), Epic – UK No. 4
Crystal Tips and Mighty Mice (March 1981), Epic – withdrawn after promotional copies were released, issued by Cherry Red in 2008

Singles
"I'm So Attractive" / "Guitar Hero" 7" (November 1979), CBS
"Irene" / "Barbarellas" / "Shy" / "Cridsilla" double-7" (April 1980), Epic – UK No. 56
"Friends" / "Je T'Aime" 7" (July 1980), Epic – withdrawn
"Now You Tell Me That We're Through" / "Je T'Aime" 7" (September 1980), Epic
"Life in a Day" / "More Than a Friend" 7" (February 1981), Epic
"We'll Win" / "You Won't Get to Me" 7" (July 1981), Epic
"There's Always Work" / "Work Phase" 7"/12" (April 1983), Rialto

Wendy Wu
"For Your Love" / "Charlotte" 7" (March 1982), Epic
"Run Jilly Run" / "Neanderthal Boy" 7" (September 1982), Epic
"Let Me Go" / "Love Tonight" 7" (October 1983), Epic

References

External links
Wendy Wu and The Photos
Paul Rencher's account of his time with Satan's Rats
Oliver Harrison official website
Oliver Harrison IMDB

English new wave musical groups
Musical groups from the West Midlands (region)